Roderick Wesley Odom (born September 23, 1991) is an American professional basketball player from Central Islip, New York for Keravnos of the Cyprus Basketball Division 1. He attended Vanderbilt University. Odom is a 6'9, 215 pound combo forward.

Personal life 
Odom attended Middlesex School, in Concord, Massachusetts. He played all 5 positions for the Middlesex School where he was one of the most heavily recruited players in the nation. Odom ultimately chose between Harvard, Princeton, Louisville, Arizona and Vanderbilt, and had offers from West Virginia, Michigan, UConn, Boston College, and Oklahoma State as well.

College career 
Odom played collegiately at Vanderbilt from 2010 to 2014. He played in all 134 games of his career. He was a member of the Vanderbilt University SEC Championship team in 2012. He managed to improve his number in his last two campaigns by averaging 10.4 points and 4.5 rebounds in his junior year, and 13.6 points and 5.2 rebounds in his senior year. In his senior year he became one of the nation's best three point shooters, while shooting 38.5 percent.  He left the Commodores earning All-SEC second team and ALL-SEC honorable mention (Associated Press). He also was named to the SEC Academic honor roll in his senior year. He graduated with a degree in Economics, and Corporate Strategy.

Professional career 
Odom was selected by the Golden State Warriors, to participate in the NBA Summer League in Las Vegas in the summer of 2014. In August 2014 he signed for Greek Basket League club KAOD.
In Odom's rookie season with KAOD, Odom averaged 9 points and 5 rebounds per game.

July 2015, Virtus Bologna finalized an agreement with Rod Odom to play for 2015-2016 Season.

In the 2017-18 season Odom played for Levallois Metropolitans and averaged 10 points and 3.8 rebounds per game. Odom signed with Nizhny Novgorod of the Russian league on July 17, 2018.

References

External links
 Is Vanderbilt’s Rod Odom Shooting His Way on to the NBA Radar?

1991 births
Living people
American expatriate basketball people in France
American expatriate basketball people in Greece
American expatriate basketball people in Italy
American expatriate basketball people in Kazakhstan
American expatriate basketball people in Russia
American men's basketball players
Basketball players from New York (state)
BC Astana players
BC Nizhny Novgorod players
K.A.O.D. B.C. players
Middlesex School alumni
Metropolitans 92 players
People from Central Islip, New York
Power forwards (basketball)
Sportspeople from Suffolk County, New York
Vanderbilt Commodores men's basketball players
Virtus Bologna players